Events from the year 1409 in France

Incumbents
 Monarch – Charles VI

Events
 9 December - Louis II of Anjou founds the University of Aix

Births
 2 March - Jean II, Duke of Alençon, nobleman (died 1476)
 13 September - Joan of Valois, Duchess of Alençon, noblewoman (died 1432)

Deaths
 13 September - Isabella of Valois, widow of Richard II of England (born 1389)
 17 October - Jean de Montaigu, royal favourite (born 1363)

References

1400s in France